The 9th United States Congress was a meeting of the legislative branch of the United States federal government, consisting of the United States Senate and the United States House of Representatives. It met in Washington, D.C. from March 4, 1805, to March 4, 1807, during the fifth and sixth years of Thomas Jefferson's presidency. The apportionment of seats in the House of Representatives was based on the 1800 United States census. Both chambers had a Democratic-Republican majority.

Major events 

 March 4, 1805: President Thomas Jefferson begins his second term.
 June 1, 1805: First Barbary War ends.
 November 7, 1805: Lewis and Clark Expedition arrives at the Pacific Ocean.
 September 23, 1806: Lewis and Clark Expedition returns to St. Louis, Missouri, thereby ending the exploration of the Louisiana Territory and the Pacific Northwest.
 February 19, 1807: Former Vice President Aaron Burr is tried for conspiracy and acquitted.

Major legislation 

 March 29, 1806 - Cumberland Road, ch. 19, 
 February 24, 1807 - Seventh Circuit Act of 1807, ch. 16, 
 March 2, 1807 - Act Prohibiting Importation of Slaves, ch. 22, 
 March 3, 1807 - Insurrection Act, ch. 39,

Territories organized 
 June 30, 1805 Michigan Territory was formed from a portion of the Indiana Territory

Party summary 
The count below identifies party affiliations at the beginning of the first session of this Congress. Changes resulting from subsequent replacements are shown below in the "Changes in membership" section.

Senate

House of Representatives

Leadership

Senate 
 President: George Clinton (DR)
 President pro tempore: Samuel Smith (DR)

House of Representatives 
 Speaker: Nathaniel Macon (DR)

Members 
This list is arranged by chamber, then by state. Senators are listed by class, and representatives are listed by district.
Skip to House of Representatives, below

Senate 
Senators were elected by the state legislatures every two years, with one-third beginning new six-year terms with each Congress. Preceding the names in the list below are Senate class numbers, which indicate the cycle of their election.

Connecticut 
 1. James Hillhouse (F)
 3. Uriah Tracy (F)

Delaware 
 1. Samuel White (F)
 2. James A. Bayard (F)

Georgia 
 2. Abraham Baldwin (DR)
 3. James Jackson (DR), until March 19, 1806
 John Milledge (DR), from June 19, 1806

Kentucky 
 2. Buckner Thruston (DR)
 3. John Breckinridge (DR), until August 7, 1805
 John Adair (DR), November 8, 1805 – November 18, 1806
 Henry Clay (DR), from November 19, 1806

Maryland 
 1. Samuel Smith (DR)
 3. Robert Wright (DR), until November 12, 1806
 Philip Reed (DR), from November 25, 1806

Massachusetts 
 1. John Quincy Adams (F)
 2. Timothy Pickering (F)

New Hampshire 
 2. Nicholas Gilman (DR)
 3. William Plumer (F)

New Jersey 
 1. John Condit (DR)
 2. Aaron Kitchell (DR)

New York 
 1. Samuel L. Mitchill (DR)
 3. John Smith (DR)

North Carolina 
 2. James Turner (DR), from December 22, 1805
 3. David Stone (DR), until February 17, 1807

Ohio 
 1. John Smith (DR)
 3. Thomas Worthington (DR)

Pennsylvania 
 1. Samuel Maclay (DR)
 3. George Logan (DR)

Rhode Island 
 1. Benjamin Howland (DR)
 2. James Fenner (DR)

South Carolina 
 2. Thomas Sumter (DR)
 3. John Gaillard (DR)

Tennessee 
 1. Joseph Anderson (DR)
 2. Daniel Smith (DR)

Vermont 
 1. Israel Smith (DR)
 3. Stephen R. Bradley (DR)

Virginia 
 1. Andrew Moore (DR)
 2. William B. Giles (DR)

House of Representatives 
The names of members of the House of Representatives are listed by their district numbers

Connecticut 
All representatives were elected statewide on a general ticket.
 . Samuel W. Dana (F)
 . John Davenport (F)
 . Jonathan O. Moseley (F)
 . Timothy Pitkin (F), seated September 16, 1805
 . John Cotton Smith (F), until August 1806
 Theodore Dwight (F), seated December 1, 1806
 . Lewis B. Sturges (F), seated September 16, 1805
 . Benjamin Tallmadge (F)

Delaware 
 . James M. Broom (F)

Georgia 
All representatives were elected statewide on a general ticket.
 . Joseph Bryan (DR), until 1806
 Dennis Smelt (DR), from September 1, 1806
 . Peter Early (DR)
 . David Meriwether (DR)
 . Cowles Mead (DR), until December 24, 1805
 Thomas Spalding (DR), December 24, 1805 – 1806
 William W. Bibb (DR), from January 26, 1807

Kentucky 
 . Matthew Lyon (DR)
 . John Boyle (DR)
 . Matthew Walton (DR)
 . Thomas Sandford (DR)
 . John Fowler (DR)
 . George M. Bedinger (DR)

Maryland 
The 5th district was a plural district with two representatives.
 . John Campbell (F)
 . Leonard Covington (DR)
 . Patrick Magruder (DR)
 . Roger Nelson (DR)
 . William McCreery (DR)
 . Nicholas R. Moore (DR)
 . John Archer (DR)
 . Joseph H. Nicholson (DR), until March 1, 1806
 Edward Lloyd (DR), from December 3, 1806
 . Charles Goldsborough (F)

Massachusetts 
 . Josiah Quincy (F)
 . Jacob Crowninshield (DR)
 . Jeremiah Nelson (F)
 . Joseph Bradley Varnum (DR)
 . William Ely (F)
 . Samuel Taggart (F)
 . Joseph Barker (DR)
 . Isaiah L. Green (DR)
 . Phanuel Bishop (DR)
 . Seth Hastings (F)
 . William Stedman (F)
 . Barnabas Bidwell (DR)
 . Ebenezer Seaver (DR)
 . Richard Cutts (DR)
 . Peleg Wadsworth (F)
 . Orchard Cook (DR)
 . John Chandler (DR)

New Hampshire 
All representatives were elected statewide on a general ticket.
 . Silas Betton (F)
 . Caleb Ellis (F)
 . David Hough (F)
 . Samuel Tenney (F)
 . Thomas W. Thompson (F)

New Jersey 
All representatives were elected statewide on a general ticket.
 . Ezra Darby (DR)
 . Ebenezer Elmer (DR)
 . William Helms (DR)
 . John Lambert (DR)
 . James Sloan (DR)
 . Henry Southard (DR)

New York 
 . Eliphalet Wickes (DR)
Joint district with two seats.
Gurdon S. Mumford (DR)
George Clinton Jr. (DR)
 . Philip Van Cortlandt (DR)
 . John Blake Jr. (DR)
 . Daniel C. Verplanck (DR)
 . Martin G. Schuneman (DR)
 . Henry W. Livingston (F)
 . Killian K. Van Rensselaer (F)
 . Josiah Masters (DR)
 . Peter Sailly (DR)
 . David Thomas (DR)
 . Thomas Sammons (DR)
 . John Russell (DR)
 . Nathan Williams (DR)
 . Uri Tracy (DR)
 . Silas Halsey (DR)

North Carolina 
 . Thomas Wynns (DR)
 . Willis Alston (DR)
 . Thomas Blount (DR)
 . William Blackledge (DR)
 . Thomas Kenan (DR)
 . Nathaniel Macon (DR)
 . Duncan McFarlan (DR)
 . Richard Stanford (DR)
 . Marmaduke Williams (DR)
 . Nathaniel Alexander (DR), until November 1805
 Evan S. Alexander (DR), from February 24, 1806
 . James Holland (DR)
 . Joseph Winston (DR)

Ohio 
 . Jeremiah Morrow (DR)

Pennsylvania 
There were four plural districts, the 1st, 2nd, & 3rd had three representatives each, the 4th had two representatives.
 . Joseph Clay (DR)
 . Michael Leib (DR), until February 14, 1806
 John Porter (DR), from December 8, 1806
 . Jacob Richards (DR)
 . Robert Brown (DR)
 . Frederick Conrad (DR)
 . John Pugh (DR)
 . Isaac Anderson (DR)
 . Christian Lower (DR), until December 19, 1806, vacant thereafter
 . John Whitehill (DR)
 . David Bard (DR)
 . John A. Hanna (DR), until July 23, 1805
 Robert Whitehill (DR), from November 7, 1805
 . Andrew Gregg (DR)
 . James Kelly (F)
 . John Rea (DR)
 . William Findley (DR)
 . John Smilie (DR)
 . John Hamilton (DR)
 . Samuel Smith (DR), seated November 7, 1805

Rhode Island 
Both representatives were elected statewide on a general ticket.
 . Nehemiah Knight (DR)
 . Joseph Stanton Jr. (DR)

South Carolina 
 . Robert Marion (DR)
 . William Butler Sr. (DR)
 . David R. Williams (DR)
 . O'Brien Smith (DR)
 . Richard Winn (DR)
 . Levi Casey (DR), until February 3, 1807, vacant thereafter
 . Thomas Moore (DR)
 . Elias Earle (DR)

Tennessee 
 . John Rhea (DR)
 . George W. Campbell (DR)
 . William Dickson (DR)

Vermont 
 . Gideon Olin (DR)
 . James Elliott (F)
 . James Fisk (DR)
 . Martin Chittenden (F)

Virginia 
 . John G. Jackson (DR)
 . John Morrow (DR)
 . John Smith (DR)
 . David Holmes (DR)
 . Alexander Wilson (DR)
 . Abram Trigg (DR)
 . Joseph Lewis Jr. (F)
 . Walter Jones (DR)
 . Philip R. Thompson (DR)
 . John Dawson (DR)
 . James M. Garnett (DR)
 . Burwell Bassett (DR)
 . Christopher Clark (DR), until July 1, 1806
 William A. Burwell (DR), from December 1, 1806
 . Matthew Clay (DR)
 . John Randolph (DR)
 . John W. Eppes (DR)
 . John Claiborne (DR)
 . Peterson Goodwyn (DR)
 . Edwin Gray (DR)
 . Thomas Newton Jr. (DR)
 . Thomas M. Randolph (DR)
 . John Clopton (DR)

Non-voting members 
 . Benjamin Parke, seated December 12, 1805
 . William Lattimore
 . Daniel Clark, seated December 1, 1806

Changes in membership 
The count below reflects changes from the beginning of this Congress.

Senate 

|-
| North Carolina(2)
| Vacant
| Montfort Stokes (DR) was elected in 1804 but declined the position.Successor elected December 22, 1805.
|  | James Turner (DR)
| Seated December 22, 1805

|-
| Kentucky(3)
|  | John Breckinridge (DR)
| Resigned August 7, 1805, after being appointed United States Attorney General.Successor elected November 8, 1805, to finish the term ending March 4, 1807.
|  | John Adair (DR)
| Seated November 8, 1805

|-
| Georgia(3)
|  | James Jackson (DR)
| Died March 19, 1806.Winner elected June 19, 1806, to finish the term ending March 4, 1807.
|  | John Milledge (DR)
| Seated June 19, 1806

|-
| Maryland(3)
|  | Robert Wright (DR)
| Resigned November 12, 1806, after being elected Governor of Maryland.Successor elected November 25, 1806, to finish the term ending March 4, 1807 (as well as to the next term).
|  | Philip Reed (DR)
| Seated November 25, 1806

|-
| Kentucky(3)
|  | John Adair (DR)
| Resigned November 18, 1806, after losing the election to the next term.Successor elected November 19, 1806, despite being younger than the constitutional age minimum.
|  | Henry Clay (DR)
| Seated November 19, 1806

|-
| North Carolina(3)
|  | David Stone (DR)
| Resigned February 17, 1807.Vacant for remainder of Congress.
| Vacant

|}

House of Representatives 

|-
| 
| Vacant
| Calvin Goddard (F) resigned before the beginning of this Congress
|  | Timothy Pitkin (F)
| Seated September 16, 1805

|-
| 
| Vacant
| Roger Griswold (F) resigned before the beginning of this Congress
|  | Lewis B. Sturges (F)
| Seated September 16, 1805

|-
| 
| Vacant
| John B. C. Lucas (DR) resigned before the beginning of this Congress
|  | Samuel Smith (DR)
| Seated November 7, 1805

|-
| 
|  | John A. Hanna (DR)
| Died July 23, 1805
|  | Robert Whitehill (DR)
| Seated November 7, 1805

|-
| 
|  | Nathaniel Alexander (DR)
| Resigned November, 1805 after being elected Governor of North Carolina
|  | Evan S. Alexander (DR)
| Seated February 24, 1806

|-
| nowrap | 
| Vacant
| Territory elected delegate to Congress for first time
| Benjamin Parke
| Elected December 12, 1805

|-
| 
|  | Cowles Mead (DR)
| Lost contested election December 24, 1805
|  | Thomas Spalding (DR)
| Seated December 24, 1805

|-
| 
|  | Joseph Bryan (DR)
| Resigned sometime in 1806
|  | Dennis Smelt (DR)
| September 1, 1806

|-
| 
|  | Thomas Spalding (DR)
| Resigned sometime in 1806
|  | William W. Bibb (DR)
| Seated January 26, 1807

|-
| 
|  | Michael Leib (DR)
| Resigned February 14, 1806
|  | John Porter (DR)
| Seated December 8, 1806

|-
| 
|  | Joseph H. Nicholson (DR)
| Resigned March 1, 1806
|  | Edward Lloyd (DR)
| Seated December 3, 1806

|-
| 
|  | Christopher H. Clark (DR)
| Resigned July 1, 1806
|  | William A. Burwell (DR)
| December 1, 1806

|-
| 
|  | John Cotton Smith (F)
| Resigned sometime in August, 1806
|  | Theodore Dwight (F)
| December 1, 1806

|-
| nowrap | 
| Vacant
| Territory elected delegate to Congress for first time
| Daniel Clark
| Elected December 1, 1806

|-
| 
|  | Christian Lower (DR)
| Resigned December 19, 1806
| Vacant
| Not filled for remainder of term

|-
| 
|  | Levi Casey (DR)
| Died February 3, 1807
| Vacant
| Not filled for remainder of term

|}

Committees
Lists of committees and their party leaders.

Senate

 Army Regulations (Select)
 Whole

House of Representatives

 Accounts (Chairman: Frederick Conrad)
 Claims (Chairman: John C. Smith then David Holmes)
 Commerce and Manufactures (Chairman: Jacob Crowninshield)
 Elections (Chairman: William Findley)
 Public Lands (Chairman: Andrew Gregg then John Boyle then Andrew Gregg)
 Revisal and Unfinished Business (Chairman: Samuel Tenney)
 Rules (Select)
 Standards of Official Conduct 
 Ways and Means (Chairman: John Randolph then Joseph Clay)
 Whole

Joint committees

 Enrolled Bills (Chairman: N/A then Sen. James Turner)
 The Library (Chairman: N/A)

Employees

Legislative branch agency directors 
Architect of the Capitol: Benjamin Latrobe
Librarian of Congress: John J. Beckley

Senate 
 Chaplain: Alexander T. McCormick, Episcopalian, elected November 7, 1804
 Edward Gantt, Episcopalian, elected December 4, 1805
 John J. Sayrs, Episcopalian, elected December 3, 1806
 Secretary: Samuel A. Otis
 Sergeant at Arms: James Mathers

House of Representatives 
Chaplain: James Laurie, Presbyterian, elected December 2, 1805
 Robert Elliot, Presbyterian, elected December 1, 1806
Clerk: John Beckley
Doorkeeper: Thomas Claxton
Reading Clerks: 
Sergeant at Arms: Joseph Wheaton

See also 
 1804 United States elections (elections leading to this Congress)
 1804 United States presidential election
 1804–05 United States Senate elections
 1804–05 United States House of Representatives elections
 1806 United States elections (elections during this Congress, leading to the next Congress)
 1806–07 United States Senate elections
 1806–07 United States House of Representatives elections

Notes

References

External links 
Statutes at Large, 1789-1875
Senate Journal, First Forty-three Sessions of Congress
House Journal, First Forty-three Sessions of Congress
Biographical Directory of the U.S. Congress
U.S. House of Representatives: House History
U.S. Senate: Statistics and Lists